Urbanfetch, founded in 1999 and closed down in 2000, was a dot-com company which enabled customers to order products (DVDs, music, books, snacks, gifts, etc.) online and have them delivered by bike messenger in less than an hour within certain delivery areas covering most of Manhattan and London.

The company's business plan was essentially identical to that of Kozmo.com, which led to a lawsuit from them. Apparently, the founder of Urbanfetch, Ross Stevens, had been approached to fund Kozmo, but instead launched a competing business with an identical business model. The suit was settled in December 1999.

Urbanfetch, like Kozmo, charged no delivery fee and sometimes offered significant discounts. Urbanfetch also gave away free T-shirts and hats with each order when it first launched and provided free warm cookies with each order. It ceased operations in October 2000. Its corporate delivery division was sold to Urban Express, a traditional courier service.

Urbanfetch became somewhat of a joke after an episode of The Daily Show parodied their business model to the Post Office.

Schmitt and Brown in their Build Your Own Garage (2010) conclude that the company “was buzz only and lacked a rigorous business model”.

References

Online retailers of the United States
Defunct websites
Dot-com bubble
Internet properties established in 1999
Defunct online companies of the United States
Defunct companies based in New York City
Internet properties disestablished in 2000
1999 establishments in New York (state)